Futsal at the 2009 Asian Indoor Games was held in Ho Chi Minh City, Vietnam, from 28 October to 7 November. All the women's events were in Tân Bình Gymnasium and the men's were in Phú Thọ Indoor Stadium.

Medalists

Medal table

Results

Men

Round 1

Group A

Group B

Group C

Group D

Knockout round

Quarterfinals

Semifinals

Bronze medal match

Final

Goalscorers

Women

Round 1

Group A

Group B

Knockout round

Semifinals

Bronze medal match

Final

Goalscorers

References

 Official site

2009 Asian Indoor Games events
Indoor Games
2009
2009 Asian Indoor Games